Isaac Duncan MacDougall (10 July 1897 – 4 April 1969) was a National Government, Conservative and Progressive party member of the House of Commons of Canada. He was born in Strathlorne, Nova Scotia and became an auditor, barrister, journalist and student.

MacDougall studied at St. Francis Xavier University, earning Bachelor of Arts and Master of Arts degrees.

He was first elected to Parliament at the Inverness riding in the 1925 general election after an unsuccessful campaign there as a Progressive Party candidate in the 1921 election. He was re-elected in 1926 and 1930. In the 1935 federal election, riding boundary changes meant that MacDougall's would seek re-election in the new Inverness—Richmond riding. He was defeated by Donald MacLennan of the Liberal party. MacDougall was also unsuccessful in winning back the seat in the 1940 election as a National Government candidate.

References

External links
 

1897 births
1969 deaths
Conservative Party of Canada (1867–1942) MPs
Members of the House of Commons of Canada from Nova Scotia
St. Francis Xavier University alumni